The locomotive SNCF BB 10003 was an experimental prototype locomotive converted from a SNCF BB 15000 electric locomotive and used to develop the use of asynchronous induction traction motors.

History
The locomotive BB 10003 was created from an earlier experimental machine BB 7003 in 1982. It was used to test the use of asynchronous induction motors in locomotives.

From 1986 to 1987 the locomotive was used in experiments testing the viability of a diesel electric locomotive with asynchronous traction motors; the locomotive was coupled to a remotorised SNCF CC 72000 locomotive which acted as an electrical generator.

In 1990/1 the locomotive was used as a test machine for operations of the TGV-TMST on 750 V and 3000 V. In 1998 the locomotive was converted back to a non-experimental class - as SNCF BB 15007. (SNCF Class BB 15000)

Legacy
The results were not as good as synchronous motor technology; it was not until the introduction of GTO transistor technology that series production of an asynchronous induction motored locomotive began in France, as the Eurostar TGV (1992), and later the BB 36000 Astride (1996).

Notes

References

External links

Alstom locomotives
10003
Standard gauge electric locomotives of France
Experimental locomotives
Railway locomotives introduced in 1982